Karol Fryderyk Woyda (also Wojda, 25 November 1771 in Leszno – 21 February 1845 in Warsaw) was a Polish politician and President of Warsaw between 1816 and 1830. He was later succeeded on this post by his son Kazimierz Woyda.

References

1771 births
1845 deaths
Mayors of Warsaw
Government officials of Congress Poland